Karl Moritz Schumann (17 June 1851 – 22 March 1904) was a German botanist.

Schumann was born in Görlitz. He was curator of the Botanisches Museum in Berlin-Dahlem from 1880 until 1894. He also served as the first chairman of the Deutsche Kakteen-Gesellschaft (German Cactus Society) which he founded on 6 November 1892. He died in Berlin.

Karl Moritz Schumann participated as a collaborator in Die Natürlichen Pflanzenfamilien by  Adolf Engler and K. A. E. Prantl and in Flora Brasiliensis by Carl Friedrich Philipp von Martius.

The genera Schumannianthus (Gagnepain), Schumanniophyton (Harms), Schumannia (Kuntze) and several species were named after him, including:

Bibliography
 Schumann, K. M., "Gesamtbeschreibung der Kakteen" (Complete description of cacti), 1898.
 Schumann, K. M., et al., "Kakteen (Iconographia Cactacearum) im Auftrage der Deutschen Kakteen-Gesellschaft", 1900–1921.
 Schumann, K. M., "Praktikum für morphologische und systematische Botanik", 1904.

References

External links
 
 Mexikon — brief biography and picture.
 Deutsche Kakteen Gesellschaft
 Harvard University Herbaria entry

1851 births
1904 deaths
19th-century German botanists
People from Görlitz
University of Breslau alumni
Members of the German Academy of Sciences Leopoldina